Jigsaw (also known as Jigsaw Murder) is a 1968 American mystery film directed by James Goldstone. It stars Harry Guardino and Bradford Dillman. This remake of Mirage (1965) was originally made for television but shown first in theaters.

The film was Diana Hyland's final film role before her death in March 1977.

Plot
After someone places sugar cubes laced with LSD in his cup of coffee, Jonathan Fields regains consciousness, only to find a woman drowned in his bathtub and flecks of blood on his hands and clothes. Suffering from amnesia, Fields can't think of anyplace else to turn, so he hires Arthur Belding, a private detective, to help him find out what happened. Returning to work at a scientific think tank, Fields encounters a concerned woman who claims to be his sweetheart, Helen Atterbury, and a colleague who's been after his job, Lew Haley.

A hippie, Dill, and an accomplice kidnap Belding and attempt to drug him, but the detective escapes and recuperates with the help of Sarah, his girlfriend. He and Fields eventually discover that Dr. Edward Arkroyd, the head of the think tank who had been having a romantic affair with the murder victim, has been murdered as well, and that Haley is behind both the killings. A fistfight ensues between Fields and Haley, resulting in the latter falling out a window to his death.

Cast
Harry Guardino as Arthur Belding
Bradford Dillman as Jonathan Fields
Hope Lange as Helen Atterbury
Pat Hingle as Lew Haley
Diana Hyland as Sarah
Susan Saint James as Ida
Michael J. Pollard as Dill
Victor Jory as Arkroyd

See also
List of American films of 1968

External links

1960s mystery thriller films
1968 films
American black-and-white films
American mystery thriller films
1960s English-language films
Films about amnesia
Films directed by James Goldstone
Films with screenplays by Ranald MacDougall
Universal Pictures films
1960s American films